Garra nkhruletisis is a species of cyprinid fish in the genus Garra endemic to the Chindwin River Basin in India.

References 

Garra
Taxa named by Kongbrailatpan Nebeshwar Sharma
Taxa named by Waikhom Vishwanath
Fish described in 2015